Henchir-El-Msaadine is a Roman era set of ruins near Tebourba(Ancient Thuburbo Minus) in modern Tunisia, North Africa. The site is outside of Tunis.
 
The ruins are tentatively identified as the remains of Municipium Aurelium Antoninianum Furnitanorum also known as Furnos Minor, a city of Africa Proconsularis. Furnos Minus had the rank of a Municipium (city) of Africa Proconsularis and has been identified through Epigraphic remains

The remains of a basilica have been found there, and a bishopric was known to be based in the city.
The town and its Bishopric disappeared after the Muslim conquest of the Maghreb, but the diocese was revived, in name at least, as a titular see of the Roman Catholic Church during the 20th century.

References

Roman towns and cities in Tunisia
Archaeological sites in Tunisia
Ancient Berber cities
Populated places in Tunisia